Uroplatus fangorn is a species of lizard in the family Gekkonidae. It is endemic to Madagascar.

References

Uroplatus
Reptiles described in 2020
Taxa named by Frank Glaw
Taxa named by Andolalao Rakotoarison
Taxa named by Miguel Vences
Taxa named by Mark D. Scherz
Organisms named after Tolkien and his works